Once More is a 1997 Indian Tamil-language romantic comedy film directed by S. A. Chandrasekhar. The film stars Sivaji Ganesan and Vijay. Simran, Saroja Devi, Manivannan, Charle, S. S. Chandran and Anju Aravind play supporting roles. The film was remade in Telugu as Daddy Daddy (1998).

Once More released on 4 July 1997 and became a commercial success.

Plot 
Vijay, a young businessman, whose only one aim in life is to have fun, is the managing director of a big tea estate in Ooty. His company goes on a big loss because of his mismanagement. Vijay spends most of his time in partying and flirting with girls whenever he feels like. To manage the loss to his company, Vijay invites his father Rajashekar, who is in the United States, to come to India to sign some documents. Rajashekar dies in a plane crash on his way to India. Vijay's maternal uncle Ashok comes up with the idea of having another elderly person to act as Vijay's father for a while until the documents are signed. So they visit a senior home in Coimbatore, where they meet Selvam, one of the inmates, and they request him to act as Vijay's father. He agrees to it and starts to act as Vijay's father.

Selvam observes the careless, take-it-easy life style of Vijay and is reminded of his old days when he used to be like Vijay. Selvam is very affectionate towards Vijay and he considers him as his son. Vijay finds out about Selvam's past life, that Selvam was married to Shantha and they have been living separated for the past 34 years. He wants them to get united and he searches and finds the whereabouts of Shantha. Meanwhile, Kavitha joins Vijay's company and she talks to Vijay in her own style. Vijay is knocked out by Kavitha's beauty and he falls in love with her. Then, their love gets into trouble because of Kavitha's mother. Now, Vijay tries to unite Selvam and Shantha. In return Selvam tries to unite Vijay and Kavitha. Kavitha first tries to kill Vijay to avenge her sister Anju, who committed suicide due to Vijay rejecting her love for him. But through Ashok and Selvam, Kavitha understands Vijay's good heart reunites with him. Also, Selvam and Shantha meet once again and get married 'Once More'. The film hence ends with a happy note.

Cast

Production 
The director, S. A. Chandrasekhar, convinced Sivaji Ganesan to feature in the film after Sathya Sai Baba told him to continue acting for this role. Scenes from Iruvar Ullam (1963) were also featured extensively in the film, being used as flashback scenes depicting the backstory of Ganesan and B. Saroja Devi's characters. Saroja Devi considered Once More to be a sequel to Iruvar Ullam.

The film marked the debut of actress Simran in Tamil cinema, with Once More and her other Tamil film, V.I.P. both releasing on 4 July 1997. Simran had earlier rejected Tamil films including Bharathiraja's proposed Siragugal Murivathillai, and had garnered popularity in the Tamil film industry prior to the release of her first film. She worked on Once More alongside her commitments for V.I.P., Nerrukku Ner (1997) and Poochudava (1997).

Soundtrack 
The soundtrack of the film was composed by Deva, while the lyrics were written by Vairamuthu and Palani Bharathi.

Critical reception 
K. N. Vijiyan New Straits Times wrote that the film was a good family entertainer. Ananda Vikatan rated the film 39 out of 100.

References

External links 
 

1990s Tamil-language films
1997 films
1997 romantic comedy films
Films directed by S. A. Chandrasekhar
Films scored by Deva (composer)
Indian romantic comedy films